Joan Collins is an English actress.

Joan Collins can also refer to:

Joan Collins (politician), an Irish politician
Joan Bates, born Joan Collins, self-proclaimed Princess of Sealand
Joan Collins (née Williams), participant in the British TV series The Only Way Is Essex
"The Joan Collins Fan Club", alias used by British comedian Julian Clary